The Diploma in Education and Training is an initial teacher training qualification, studied at QCF Level 5, for teaching in Further Education (FE) and the lifelong learning sector of education in the United Kingdom. Study for the Diploma in Education and Training typically follows the completion of the Certificate in Education and Training at QCF Level 4 and the Award in Education and Training at QCF Level 3. The Diploma in Education and Training qualifies a teacher for Qualified Teacher Learning and Skills (QTLS) status from the Institute for Learning. The Diploma in Education and Training replaces the Diploma in Teaching in the Lifelong Learning Sector.

References 

Educational qualifications in the United Kingdom
Teacher training